Agent 51 was an American punk rock band from Poway, California, formed in 1995. They released three albums on various record labels before going on indefinite hiatus in 2005. Over the course of their career their music evolved from straightforward punk rock to incorporate aspects of classic rock and Heavy Metal. At various times during their career the band has maintained a mythology about their origins which purports them to be rogue secret agents, on the run from a clandestine government organization with ties to extraterrestrials.

Band history

Formation
Agent 51 formed in Poway, California in 1995 under the name Area 51. Initially the band were part of a thriving local punk rock movement that included other groups such as Blink-182 and Unwritten Law. Founding members Chris Armes, Jered Herndon, and Eric Davis had attended Poway High School with Blink-182 member Tom DeLonge, and Armes' previous band Openfast had played as openers for Blink-182 on several occasions. This experience contributed to the impetus for forming Area 51.

The band's original lineup consisted of Chris Armes on guitar and vocals, Jered Herndon on bass guitar and vocals, and Eric "Airwick" Davis on  drums. Herndon and Armes met in kindergarten and first started playing music together at age 13. After the breakup of Openfast, the two began Area 51 together, writing the band's first songs. Eric Davis joined the group shortly after, and the three collaborated on a core of tunes for their eponymous demo, including "Chuck", "Designed", "Runnin' Outta Luck", and "Homecoming Queen"; songs that remain fan favorites to this day. Area 51 began to grow a following with the demo release, but personal issues would lead Herndon to leave the band in 1997. The band had previously discussed changing their name due to the number of other groups calling themselves Area 51. Herndon suggested "Agent 51", so that they could continue to use the "neighborhood watch" character Armes had designed, and the name stuck. Herndon was replaced by Greg Schneider, while Davis moved to second guitar and Rob Hunter joined as drummer. Later, the band would re-record the songs from the original demo along with new material and release it under the title Red Alert.

Early albums and mythology
Their first album, Red Alert, was released in 1998 by local label Alphabet Records. The album gained them notoriety in the local punk rock scene, and an independent music video was filmed for the title track. Armes took the stage name "Broken Armes" at this time due to an injury he suffered in 1997 which left his arm in a cast. In order to record his guitar parts on Red Alert he removed the cast himself and recorded while still injured.

Around this time the band began disseminating the mythos that they were rogue secret agents on the run from the government due to their knowledge of secrets related to extraterrestrial life. To match this theme the band wore matching black suits while performing. It also became common for the band to cover songs from the classic rock and 1970s metal genres in concert, such as AC/DC's "You Shook Me All Night Long" and "Highway to Hell." 

By the recording of their second album in 2000, Hunter had been replaced on drums by Mike "Mikey L" Levinson. The album, Just Keep Runnin', was released that year on the band's own label Suburban Hooligans Records. The music was faster and slightly less punk-based than Red Alert, and included several songs which had become favorites in the band's live set over the last few years such as "Who's Gunna Riot?" and "The Last Pirate Standing." The album's artwork and liner notes greatly expanded on their secret agent mythos by describing each member as a rogue agent enhanced with super powers through extraterrestrial DNA and technology, as well as detailing their struggle against a secret government organization called "The Agency." The band played on the Warped Tour that summer on the Ernie Ball side stage, winning Ernie Ball's Battle of the Bands competition. They also recorded the theme song for the short-lived San Diego public-access television cable TV show "Radiation Nation." The song was later included on the 2001 Warped Tour compilation.

Just Keep Runnin caught the attention of Billie Joe Armstrong of Green Day and his label Adeline Records, who re-released it in 2001 with 2 bonus tracks recorded with new bassist Sean Scura, as Schneider had by then left the group. The band continued to tour, playing at San Diego's Street Scene and other festivals.

Success and break-up
Agent 51's next album was 2003's The Red & the Black, released on southern California label Surfdog Records. With it the band moved towards a sound more reminiscent of classic rock and Heavy Metal bands such as AC/DC, Motörhead and Def Leppard. They also distanced themselves from their secret agent mythos by not mentioning extraterrestrials or conspiracies, and by ceasing to wear their matching suits in concert. The song "She's My Heroine" received airplay on local rock radio station 91X, while "American Rock n Roll" was used in the opening episode of MTV's The Real World: San Diego and "Air Raid" was later used in the video game Big Mutha Truckers 2. The album was nominated in several categories at the 2003 San Diego Music Awards and won for "best punk album."

Despite their growing popularity, however, Armes announced that he was leaving the band due to musical and financial pressures. Davis and Levinson formed 51 Guns in the summer of 2004, along with drummer Adam Rapps of Pivit. Agent 51 remained inactive until June 2005.

Reunion and recent activity
On June 5, 2005 Agent 51 played a reunion show at SOMA, an all-ages music venue in San Diego. This performance featured the most recent lineup of the band including Armes, Davis, and Scura, with drummer Adam Rapps replacing Levinson. The band once again wore matching black suits and made reference to "The Agency" and other aspects of their secret agent mythos. The band remained mostly inactive after this reunion show. Davis resumed playing with 51 Guns, who renamed themselves Arm the Angels in 2006. Scura moved to Utah but eventually returned to San Diego. Levinson left 51 Guns, reuniting with Schneider to form The Megas, a video-game rock band based in Los Angeles. Armes, meanwhile, announced his involvement with The Rattlesnake Aces. Agent 51 played a "comeback" show with Pivit and Arm the Angels in February 2008 with the lineup of Armes, Davis, Scura, and Levinson, with Greg Schneider also performing on several songs. The band's penultimate performance was in July 2008, again with Pivit and Arm the Angels. To coincide with this concert, the band and Alphabet Records re-released Red Alert through iTunes and other digital retailers. The Band's most recent show was performed in Jan 2012 with the classic lineup coinciding with a brand new 2 song E.P. released digitally to iTunes entitled 'Operation Panther.' In early 2021, Chris released his first solo Album Ocotillo Rose. The first single 'Lord Let Me Run' debuted on Yucca Thunder Records with plans to digitally release the remaining singles from the album throughout 2021.

Band members

Recent members
Chris "Broken" Armes - guitar, lead vocals
Eric "Airwick / E-Rock" Davis - guitar, vocals
Sean Scura - bass, vocals
Mike "Mikey Hell" Levinson - drums

Past members
Jered Herndon - bass (1995-1997)
Rob Hunter - drums (1997–1999)
Greg Schneider - bass (1997–2000)
Adam Rapps - drums (2005 reunion show)

Discography

The discography of Agent 51 consists of three studio albums, one EP, one demo, and one music video.

Studio albumsI Just Keep Runnin' was re-released in 2001 by Adeline Records.

 Extended plays I Agent 51 is a pre-release teaser with four songs from The Red & the Black.

 Extended plays 

 Demos I Demos and More consists of demos and finished tracks for Red Alert.

 Music videos 

 Other appearances 
The following Agent 51 songs were released on compilation albums and as music downloads. This is not an exhaustive list; songs that were first released on the band's albums are not included.I "Radiation Nation" was originally recorded as the theme song for a local San Diego punk rock television show.II''' This is an early version of "Wrecking Ball"; the song was re-recorded for The Red & the Black''.

References

External links

Official Website of Chris Armes Solo Work
Official Rattlesnake Aces Facebook Page
Agent 51 Official Facebook Page
Official Myspace profile
''Just Keep Runnin'''-era official site
51 Guns official Myspace profile

Punk rock groups from California
Musical groups from San Diego
Adeline Records artists